This page lists all peerages created for retiring speakers of the House of Commons. Extant titles are in bold.

Peerages created for the Speaker of the House of Commons

Speakers never raised to the peerage

See also
List of speakers of the British House of Commons
List of peerages held by prime ministers of the United Kingdom
List of peerages created for Lord Chancellors and Lord Keepers

Notes

External links
 from the Parliament of the United Kingdom website.

Speakers of the House of Commons

List
Speaker